Whitehaven is a town and civil parish in the Borough of Copeland, Cumbria, England. It contains over 170 buildings that are recorded in the National Heritage List for England.  Of these, one is listed at Grade I, the highest of the three grades, six are at Grade II*, the middle grade, and the others are at Grade II, the lowest grade.

Whitehaven is a natural port, and the harbour developed in the 17th century mainly for the export of coal from the local mines.  During the 18th century the harbour expanded and the town was laid out in a grid plan, often with a building such as a church at the end to provide a vista.  During the 20th century the amount of work done by the port declined, and the export of coal finally ended in the 1980s.  During this time a number of the town's houses and other buildings were demolished.

Nevertheless, most of the listed buildings are houses and shops of various sizes, many of them in Georgian style.  Listed buildings remaining from the industrial past include structures in and around the harbour, warehouses, a former flax mill, and colliery buildings now used as a museum.  Other listed buildings include churches, civic buildings, hotels and public houses, banks. air shaft caps providing ventilation for a railway tunnel, and a market hall


Key

Buildings

Notes and references

Notes

Citations

Sources

Lists of listed buildings in Cumbria
Listed buildings